Milcah Chemos Cheywa (born 24 February 1986 in Bugaa, Mount Elgon District) is a runner from Kenya who specialises in 3000 metres steeplechase. She was, until 2015, African record holder at the distance and is the gold medalist of the 2013 World Championships in Athletics.

Early life
She is from Bugaa village, but moved to Kitale with her family, where she went to Matumbei and St Phillips primary schools. Later she went to St Claire's Girls High School in Maragoli.

After schooling she went to the Kenya Police College (KPC) in Kiganjo in 2005. There she met Alex Sang and soon married. He urged her to start running, but she did not start serious training until 2008. Initially racing over 800 and 1500 metres, she finished 7th in the 800 metres at the 2008 Kenyan Olympic trials, 12 seconds behind the winner Pamela Jelimo.

Career

2009
Chemos converted to steeplechase running in March 2009, after being introduced to the discipline by Richard Mateelong, the Olympic steeplechase medalist posted at KPC. She won her debut race, at the Athletics Kenya meeting in Kakamega, timing 9:54.4, and soon improved her PB to 9:22.33 at the KBC Night of Athletics meeting in Heusden-Zolder, Belgium. Competing in the 2009 World Championships, she won a bronze medal in a personal best 9:08.57, behind Marta Domínguez and Yuliya Zarudneva. Dominguez was disqualified afterward for a doping violation.

2010
In 2010, Chemos won gold medals in the 3000 metre steeplechase at the African Championships and the Commonwealth Games, heading a Kenyan clean sweep of the medals in the latter. She also took Diamond League victories in Oslo, Rome, Eugene and London, en route to capturing the overall Diamond League title in the steeplechase.

As a result of her successes during the 2010 season, Chemos was one of five females shortlisted for the IAAF World Athlete of the Year award, won by high jumper Blanka Vlašić.

2011
Chemos entered the 2011 World Championships in Daegu, South Korea as favourite for the 3000 metres steeplechase, having won all five of the Diamond League races in which she had competed prior to the championship. However, she was unable to improve upon her bronze medal of two years previous, finishing in third place, over 10 seconds behind race winner Yuliya Zaripova. Chemos subsequently lost again to Zaripova at the final Diamond League meeting of the season – the Memorial Van Damme in Brussels – but the Kenyan had already established an unbeatable lead in the Diamond Race standings and thus retained her title.

2012
At the start of 2012, Chemos ran at the Cross de San Sebastián and was the runner-up behind Nazareth Weldu. She began the 2012 IAAF Diamond League season in dominant fashion, winning the steeplechase in Shanghai, Eugene and Oslo. At the third of these victories, Chemos broke the African 3000 metre steeplechase record of Eunice Jepkorir, winning in a new personal best and Bislett Games record time of 9:07.14.

In 2013, she won women's 3000m Steeplechase at the World Athletics Championships, clocking in 9:36.16.

Personal life
Her husband Alex Sang is a middle-distance runner. They have a daughter as of 2010.

Like Milcah, running siblings Linet Masai and Moses Masai are from Bugaa village.

International competitions

Personal bests

All information taken from IAAF profile.

References

External links

1986 births
Living people
People from Western Province (Kenya)
Kenyan female long-distance runners
Kenyan female steeplechase runners
Olympic athletes of Kenya
Athletes (track and field) at the 2012 Summer Olympics
Commonwealth Games gold medallists for Kenya
Commonwealth Games silver medallists for Kenya
Commonwealth Games medallists in athletics
Athletes (track and field) at the 2010 Commonwealth Games
Athletes (track and field) at the 2014 Commonwealth Games
World Athletics Championships athletes for Kenya
World Athletics Championships medalists
Diamond League winners
World Athletics Championships winners
Medallists at the 2010 Commonwealth Games